Ira Demon Brown (born August 3, 1982) is a Japanese-American professional basketball player who currently plays for the Osaka Evessa of the Japanese B.League. He had also spent three years with the Hirachi/Shibuya Sunrockers, as well as two years with the Toyama Grouses during his career in Japan.

Childhood and Adolescence 
Brown grew up in Corsicana, Texas.

Japanese national 
He became a Japanese citizen after extensive language testing and a waiting period which took two years. As of 2018, he resides in Okinawa.

He was a member of Japan's national basketball team at the 2016 FIBA Asia Challenge in Tehran, Iran, where he recorded the most rebounds, steals and blocks for his team.

He played 3x3 basketball for Japan in the 2021 Olympics.

The Basketball Tournament
Ira Brown played for Team A Few Good Men in the 2018 edition of The Basketball Tournament. In two games, he averaged five points per game and 4.5 rebounds per game on 40 percent shooting. A Few Good Men made it to the Second Round before falling to Team Gael Force.

Baseball career
He was drafted in 2001 by the Kansas City Royals, and played in the minors for five years.

Career statistics 

|-
| align="left" |  2011–12
| align="left" | Toyama
| 52 || 52 || 30.6 || .475 || .323 || .625 || 6.3 || 1.9 || 1.4 || 0.9 ||  12.7
|-
| align="left" |  2012–13
| align="left" | Toyama
| 50 || 48 || 31.8 || .537 || .254 || .658 || 9.1 || 3.2 || 2.0 || 1.2 ||  16.5
|-
| align="left" |  2013–14
| align="left" | Toyama
| 52 || 52 || 34.2 || .523 || .419 || .650 || 10.0 || 3.3 || 1.6 ||  2.6 || 16.8 
|-
| align="left" |  2014–15
| align="left" | Hitachi
| 54 || 45 || 27.8 || .503 || .364 || .651 || 7.9 || 2.1 || 0.9 || 1.0 ||  13.7 
|-
| align="left" |  2015–16
| align="left" | Hitachi
| 54 || 50 || 29.3 || .506 || .214 || .667 || 6.9 || 1.9 || 1.2 || 0.8 ||  13.2 
|-
| align="left" |  2016–17
| align="left" | Shibuya
| 57 || 44 || 29.3 || .517 || .358 || .597 || 8.3 || 2.5 || 1.3 || 0.9 ||  13.7
|-
| align="left" |  2017–18
| align="left" | Ryukyu
| 60 || 58 || 28.7 || .490 ||.409  || .614 ||7.0  ||2.9  || 1.3 || 0.8 || 11.2
|-

References

External links
 Profile at Osaka Evessa
 FIBA Asia Challenge 2016 Profile
 Asia-basket.com Profile
 Gonzaga Bulldogs bio

1982 births
Living people
3x3 basketball players at the 2020 Summer Olympics
American expatriate basketball people in Argentina
American expatriate basketball people in Japan
American expatriate basketball people in Mexico
American expatriate basketball people in the Philippines
American men's 3x3 basketball players
American men's basketball players
Baseball players from Texas
Basketball players from Texas
Burlington Bees players
Edmonton Cracker-Cats players
Gonzaga Bulldogs men's basketball players
Gulf Coast Royals players
Japanese men's basketball players
Japanese people of African-American descent
Japan national 3x3 basketball team players
Olympic 3x3 basketball players of Japan
Osaka Evessa players
People from Corsicana, Texas
People from Willis, Texas
Philippine Basketball Association imports
Phoenix Bears men's basketball players
Power forwards (basketball)
Ryukyu Golden Kings players
San Miguel Beermen players
Shreveport Sports players
Spokane Indians players
Sportspeople from the Houston metropolitan area
Sun Rockers Shibuya players
Toyama Grouses players